Przesieka  is a village in Lower Silesia, southwestern Poland. It belongs to Lower Silesian Voivodeship, in Jelenia Góra County, Gmina Podgórzyn. It is one of the most important centres of mountain hiking.

It is 15 minutes drive from the centre of Jelenia Góra (5 minutes drive from Cieplice Spa). There is a regular city bus going to Przesieka from Jelenia Góra central train station. Several hiking routes to Karkonosze Mountains begin in Przesieka. One of the most widely used is a route (2 h walk) to Karkonoska Mountain Pass (Polish "Przełęcz Karkonoska"). Other popular routes lead to Chojnik Castle (German Kynast) (1 hour walk), and Karpacz (1.5 h walk). An interesting place to visit in Przesieka is Podgórna Waterfall (547 m above sea level).

External links
 Website

Villages in Karkonosze County